The 2010–11 season was AEL Kalloni first season in Football League 2.

Greek Cup

Football League 2

AEL Kalloni
AEL Kalloni F.C. seasons